Norbert Könyves (born 10 June 1989) is a Hungarian footballer who plays for Diósgyőri VTK.

Born in Senta, SR Serbia, SFR Yugoslavia, Könyves grew up in Mol, where his family comes from.

Club career

Debrecen
On 3 April 2018, he scored a hat-trick against Budapest Honvéd in the quarter-finals of the 2017–18 Magyar Kupa at the Nagyerdei Stadion, Debrecen, Hungary.

International career
He made his national team debut on 11 October 2020 in a Nations League game against Serbia and scored the only goal of the game in a 1–0 away win.

Career statistics

Club

International goals
 Hungary score listed first, score column indicates score after each Könyves goal.

References

External links
MLSZ 
HLSZ 

1989 births
Living people
People from Senta
Hungarian footballers
Hungary international footballers
Hungarians in Vojvodina
Serbian footballers
Association football defenders
FK TSC Bačka Topola players
MTK Budapest FC players
Paksi FC players
Vasas SC players
Debreceni VSC players
Zalaegerszegi TE players
Diósgyőri VTK players
Nemzeti Bajnokság I players
Nemzeti Bajnokság II players